Open-source firmware is firmware that is published under an open-source license. It can be contrasted with proprietary firmware, which is published under a proprietary license or EULA.

Examples 

 OpenWrt
 coreboot
 SeaBIOS
 LinuxBoot
 Libreboot
 PinePhone LTE modem

Further reading

References 

Firmware
Open-source firmware